David Robert Horton (born 1945) is an Australian writer who has been described as a polymath, with qualifications and careers in science and the arts. He is known for his compilation of the work The Encyclopaedia of Aboriginal Australia: Aboriginal and Torres Strait Islander history, society and culture in 1994, and its accompanying map of Aboriginal groupings across Australia.

Early life, education and research
Horton was born in Perth, Western Australia, in 1945. He attended John Curtin High School

In 1966 he was awarded Bachelor of Science, majoring in zoology, with Honours at the University of Western Australia, and in 1967 Master of Science (zoology) at the University of Melbourne . He then undertook a Bachelor of Arts at University of New England in Armidale, New South Wales, graduating in 1973.

He earned two doctorates and the University of New England: Doctor of Philosophy (PhD) in 1976 and Doctor of Letters (DLitt) in 1997.

He was teaching fellow at New England University from 1967 to 1973, alongside his studies there. After this, as a postdoctoral fellow, he conducted research in biogeography, graduating in 1974 at the University of York in northern England, where he continued to work until 1976. Horton's research between 1974 and 1984 included scincid lizards and biogeography, archaeozoology (sites from the Cape York Peninsula to south-west Tasmania), Pleistocene extinctions, the role of fire in Australian ecosystems, and the Aboriginal occupation of Australia during the Pleistocene.

Career
Horton has had careers in biology, archaeology and publishing and farming, as well as writing and editing many articles and books.

He joined the then Australian Institute of Aboriginal Studies (AIAS) (former name of the Australian Institute of Aboriginal and Torres Strait Islander Studies) as the Institute's osteologist in 1974, the following year taking on the role of paleoecologist. He was acting deputy principal at AIATSIS in 1984, and subsequently appointed manager of the Publications section, until he became Director of Publications in 1988–89 at Aboriginal Studies Press, the publishing arm of AIATSIS, a role he occupied until 1998.

It was while he was director of publishing that he compiled, edited and published the work for which he became known, The Encyclopaedia of Aboriginal Australia, which won two New South Wales Premier's Literary Awards as well as other awards.

During his career, he published about 100 scientific papers as well several books on biology and archaeology.

Boards and other
He was a member of the International Council for Archaeozoology (IZAC) and of an advisory panel for the New South Wales Premier's History Awards in 1997.

Writing after retirement

After retirement, he devotes his time to being a professional writer and farmer. Between 2008 and 2011, he wrote many opinion pieces for the ABC News website. He also published prolifically on a wide range of topics for the HuffPost until 2011.

Recognition 
The Encyclopaedia of Aboriginal Australia won many awards, including the NSW Premier's Literary Award 1995 "Book of the Year" and NSW Premier's Literary Award 1995 "Special Award".

Selected works

The Encyclopaedia of Aboriginal Australia: Aboriginal and Torres Strait Islander history, society and culture

References

21st-century Australian male writers
20th-century Australian male writers
Living people
1945 births
Writers from Perth, Western Australia
Writers from Western Australia
University of New England (Australia) alumni
University of Western Australia alumni
Academics of the University of York